The 2004–05 season was Colchester United's 63rd season in their history and their seventh successive season in the third tier of English football, the newly renamed League One. Alongside competing in League One, the club also participated in the FA Cup, the League Cup and the Football League Trophy.

After reaching the area final of the Football League Trophy, Colchester were eliminated by the team that they played in the final, Southend United, in the first round of the competition. However, they fared better in the League Cup, defeating Premier League West Bromwich Albion in the second round but were defeated by Southampton in the third. They also reached the fourth round of the FA Cup, where the U's further Premier League opposition in Blackburn Rovers but were beaten 3–0.

In the league, Colchester had a poor mid-season run, eventually ending the season 15th in the League One table.

Season overview
Phil Parkinson rung the changes for the new season, with numerous new signings and multiple outgoings. After a strong start to the season, topping the table after three games, a bad spell of mid-season form saw Colchester drop down the League One rankings. Just four wins in 25 games was the catalyst to a 15th-placed finish, while fans were left frustrated at Parkinson's 4-5-1 formation at home. One positive was that no team managed to score more than two goals against the U's in the league.

On 21 September 2004, West Bromwich Albion became the last top-flight club to visit Layer Road for their League Cup fixture. Colchester won 2–1, earning a trip to another Premier League side in Southampton. They pushed their hosts close, but were eventually defeated 3–2.

In the FA Cup, Colchester needed a replay to beat Mansfield Town, while also winning on their travels at Rushden & Diamonds and Hull City. In the fourth round, they were drawn against Premier League Blackburn Rovers where they lost 3–0.

Players

Transfers

In

 Total spending:  ~ £0

Out

 Total incoming:  ~ £100,000

Loans in

Loans out

Match details

League One

League table

Results round by round

Matches

Football League Cup

Football League Trophy

FA Cup

Squad statistics

Appearances and goals

|-
!colspan="16"|Players who appeared for Colchester who left during the season

|}

Goalscorers

Disciplinary record

Clean sheets
Number of games goalkeepers kept a clean sheet.

Player debuts
Players making their first-team Colchester United debut in a fully competitive match.

See also
List of Colchester United F.C. seasons

References

General
Books

Websites

Specific

2004-05
2004–05 Football League One by team